Romania competed at the 2000 Summer Olympics in Sydney, Australia. 145 competitors, 71 men and 74 women, took part in 116 events in 16 sports. At the Games, there was some controversy when gymnast Andreea Răducan was stripped of her individual all-around gold medal after testing positive for a stimulant. Răducan had taken cold medicine containing pseudoephedrine given to her by a team doctor.

Medalists

These games were Romania's best showing, both in number of gold medals and total medals won at a non-boycotted games.

|  style="text-align:left; width:72%; vertical-align:top;"|

| style="text-align:left; width:23%; vertical-align:top;"|

Athletics

Men
Track & road events

Field events

Women
Track & road events

Field events

Combined events – Heptathlon

Boxing

Men

Canoeing

Sprint
Men

Women

Qualification Legend: 'R = Qualify to repechage; QS = Qualify to semi-final; QF = Qualify directly to final

Diving

Men

Women

Fencing

Five fencers, three men and two women, represented Romania in 2000.

Men

Women

Gymnastics

Men's artistic
Team

Individual events

Women's artistic
Team

Individual events

Handball

 Aurelia Stoica
 Valeria Motogna-Beșe
 Cristina Vărzaru
 Cristina Dogaru-Cucuian
 Elena Napăr
 Gabriela Doina Tănaşe
 Lidia Drăgănescu
 Luminită Huţupan-Dinu
 Mihaela Ignat
 Nicoleta Alina Dobrin
 Ramona Farcău
 Steluța Luca
 Talida Tolnai
 Victorina Bora

Group A

Quarter-finals

5–8th place

7th place

Judo

Men

Women

Modern pentathlon

Rowing

Men

Women

Shooting

Men

Swimming

Men

Women

Table tennis

Tennis

Weightlifting

Men

Wrestling

Freestyle

Greco-Roman

See also
Romania at the 2000 Summer Paralympics

Notes

Wallechinsky, David (2004). The Complete Book of the Summer Olympics (Athens 2004 Edition). Toronto, Canada. .
International Olympic Committee (2001). The Results. Retrieved 12 November 2005.
Sydney Organising Committee for the Olympic Games (2001). Official Report of the XXVII Olympiad Volume 1: Preparing for the Games. Retrieved 20 November 2005.
Sydney Organising Committee for the Olympic Games (2001). Official Report of the XXVII Olympiad Volume 2: Celebrating the Games. Retrieved 20 November 2005.
Sydney Organising Committee for the Olympic Games (2001). The Results. Retrieved 20 November 2005.
International Olympic Committee Web Site

References

Nations at the 2000 Summer Olympics
2000 Summer Olympics
Summer Olympics